Ancylometes is a genus of Central and South American semiaquatic wandering spiders first described by Philipp Bertkau in 1880. Originally placed with the nursery web spiders, it was moved to the Ctenidae in 1967. The genus name is derived in part from Ancient Greek "" (ancylo-), meaning "crooked, bent".

These spiders live near ponds, lakes, rivers and other freshwater habitats, and can walk on water like water striders due to fine air-trapping hairs on the tips of their legs. They can also dive under the surface, and can stay underwater for over an hour by using the air trapped in hairs surrounding their book lungs. They will consume anything from insects to small lizards and, occasionally, small fish.

Description
They are sometimes referred to as "giant fishing spiders" to distinguish them from Dolomedes, a genus of smaller spiders also called "fishing spiders". Both sexes are brown with dark spots on the abdomen, and males have two thin lines along their carapace.

They have a 2-4-2 eye pattern and a reduced third claw, characteristics of the Ctenidae and Pisauridae, respectively. Members of this genus can be distinguished from all others by ventral spines found on the tarsi of the third and fourth legs.

Ancylometes and the more fully aquatic Argyroneta are the only known genera of spiders that can spin webs in water. Though these webs can catch fish, they mostly prey on fish by diving down or lying in wait until prey passes within striking distance. Once caught, these spiders will bring their prey back to the surface before eating it.

During mating, the male wraps the female with silk, and the female enters an immobile state. After about a week, she produces a cocoon and carries it with her fangs. The baby spiders take about a year to mature. Males only live for sixteen months at most, while females can live for more than two years.

The venom of Acyclomete sp, has effects on muscle contraction and preparation of the phrenic nerve diaphragm muscle, 50 µg causes depolarization of the diaphragm muscle fiber membranes. These studies indicate that the Ancylometes venom activates voltage-gated sodium channels. All of these effects of Ancylometes sp. venom on this nerve muscle preparation increase in twitch tension.

Species
 it contains eleven species:
Ancylometes amazonicus Simon, 1898 – Peru, Brazil
Ancylometes birabeni (Carcavallo & Martínez, 1961) – Argentina
Ancylometes bogotensis (Keyserling, 1877) – Honduras to Bolivia
Ancylometes concolor (Perty, 1833) (type) – Brazil, Bolivia, Paraguay, Argentina
Ancylometes hewitsoni (F. O. Pickard-Cambridge, 1897) – Bolivia, Brazil
Ancylometes japura Höfer & Brescovit, 2000 – Brazil
Ancylometes jau Höfer & Brescovit, 2000 – Brazil
Ancylometes pantanal Höfer & Brescovit, 2000 – Brazil
Ancylometes riparius Höfer & Brescovit, 2000 – Brazil
Ancylometes rufus (Walckenaer, 1837) – Northern South America
Ancylometes terrenus Höfer & Brescovit, 2000 – Brazil

References

Further reading
 Gasnier, T.R., Salette de Azevedo, C., Torres-Sanchez, M.P. & Höfer, H. (2002). Adult size of eight hunting spider species in Central Amazonia: Temporal variations and sexual dimorphisms. Journal of Arachnology 30:146-154. PDF
 Walking on the water: Biology and captive breeding of giant fishing spider Ancylometes
 Merrett, P. (1988). Notes on the biology of the neotropical pisaurid, Ancylometes bogotensis (Keyserling) (Araneae: Pisauridae). Bull. Br. arachnol. Soc. 7:197-201.

External links

 Picture of an Ancylometes sp. from French Guyana
 Website especially for the Genus Ancylometes: www.ancylometes.com

Ctenidae
Spiders of South America
Araneomorphae genera